Mayak is a new family of Ukrainian launch vehicles under development by the Pivdenne, which would be manufactured by Pivdenmash.

Engines, control systems and ground equipment are largely derived from components of existing rocket families Zenit and Tsyklon.

The Mayak family is designed to cover small-lift, medium-lift and heavy-lift requirements. Published parameters of various configurations are:

References

Space launch vehicles of Ukraine
Proposed space launch vehicles